Meteura is a genus of moths in the subfamily Arctiinae erected by George Hampson in 1900.

Species
 Meteura albicosta Hampson, 1914
 Meteura cervina T. P. Lucas, 1890

References

External links

Lithosiini
Moth genera